Rebuilding America Now is a political action committee (PAC) created to support Donald Trump's 2016 presidential campaign. A so-called Super PAC, Rebuilding America Now is permitted to raise and spend unlimited amounts of corporate, union, and individual campaign contributions under the terms of the Citizens United Supreme Court decision.

Rebuilding America Now was founded in June 2016 by Paul John Manafort, Jr. and Tom Barrack, a real-estate investor and long-time friend of Trump. Manafort tapped Laurance "Laury" Gay, godfather to one of Manafort's daughters, and Ken McKay for senior roles with the Super PAC upon its founding. Though Rebuilding America Now is one of several Super PACs founded to support Trump's bid for the presidency, it has been described as the "primary" Super PAC supporting Trump by the New York Times. Vice presidential nominee Mike Pence and Trump campaign manager Paul Manafort have both endorsed the Super PAC. Trump himself had previously denigrated the use of Super PACs, but later agreed to headline fundraising events for Rebuilding America Now.

Los Angeles real estate developer Geoffrey Palmer emerged as the first publicly-disclosed big donor to the group, having donated $2 million to the organization.

See also
Inauguration of Donald Trump
Tony Fabrizio

References 

United States political action committees
Donald Trump 2016 presidential campaign
Campaign finance in the United States